Parley Common is a Site of Special Scientific Interest (SSSI) on the edge of Ferndown in Dorset, England. The majority land owner is the Canford Estate, but among the other owners are the Diocese of Salisbury, Dorset County Council, East Dorset District Council and a few private individuals. Most of the site is managed by the Amphibian and Reptile Conservation Trust (ARC); East Dorset Countryside Management Service manage the area owned by East Dorset District Council and Dorset Countryside manage the area owned by Dorset County Council. The site was notified as an SSSI in 1983.

Rare heathland species include the sand lizard (Lacerta agilis), smooth snake (Coronella austriaca), heath grasshopper (Chorthippus vagansand) and the Dartford warbler (Sylvia undata). Parley Common has an abundance of spider fauna—at least 147 species—which includes the very rare Ero aphana, Bassaniodes robustus (syn. Xysticus robustus)—otherwise found in only a few places in the New Forest—and Gnaphosa lugubris. The site holds claim to a number of firsts: the smooth snake was first recorded in Britain in Parley Common in 1853; the Mazarine blue (Cyaniris semiargus)—now extinct in Britain—was first discovered here in the late nineteenth century; the moth Pachythelia villosella and the ringed carpet moth (Cleora cinctaria) were also first discovered here.

The site is one of many areas in the South East Dorset in which grazing by cattle has been reintroduced, as part of efforts to control the growth of scrub. Arson and illegal vehicle use have caused damage to the site, although community involvement is thought to have lessened the number of incidents.

See also
List of SSSIs in Dorset

References

External links
Dorset Heathlands list published by the Joint Nature Conservation Committee (JNCC). 
Dorset Nature Reserves of the ARC.
Nature on the Map by Natural England.
  by Poole Borough Council.

Sites of Special Scientific Interest in Dorset
Sites of Special Scientific Interest notified in 1983
Heathland Sites of Special Scientific Interest